Typostola is a genus of South Pacific huntsman spiders that was first described by Eugène Louis Simon in 1897.

Species
 it contains four species, found in Papua New Guinea and Australia:
Typostola barbata (L. Koch, 1875) (type) – Australia (Queensland)
Typostola heterochroma Hirst, 1999 – Australia (Queensland, New South Wales)
Typostola pilbara Hirst, 1999 – Australia (Western Australia)
Typostola tari Hirst, 1999 – New Guinea

See also
 List of Sparassidae species

References

Araneomorphae genera
Sparassidae
Spiders of Asia
Spiders of Australia